The Ecuador women's national football team represents Ecuador in international women's football. The team is controlled by the Ecuadorian Football Federation.

It made its debut in the 1995 Sudamericano. In the next edition three years later it reached the semifinals, its best result to date, losing the bronze play-off against Peru. In the 2006 edition, it ranked fifth, qualifying for the first time for the Pan American Games. It subsequently hosted the 2010 Sudamericano, narrowly missing the semifinals after tying at 9 points  with Argentina and Chile.

Although football is not popular for women, Ecuador marked their first-ever participation in a Women's World Cup in the Canada 2015, and also for the first time both men's and women's team participated in World Cup.

History

The women's national football team of Ecuador began in 1995, when the FEF scrapped together a team with players from provincial selectives and some existing clubs to compete in the South American Women's Football Championship. In 2005 a provincial selective was held, and teams were told that the winner would represent the national team. A team from Quito won, but Conmebol disqualified it as it was not a national selective. At this time no women's tournament existed neither professional nor amateur. As the base of relative success, club competition is the source to compete against national counterparts, and so as early as 2013 began the Campeonato Ecuatoriano de Futbol Femenino. With the Ministry of Sports impulsing such initiatives, the championship is mandating of at least 2 under 18 players, thinking of the Women's Sudamericano Sub 17.

The country qualified for the 2015 FIFA Women's World Cup after successfully winning the playoff against CONCACAF representative Trinidad and Tobago, but with only amateur and part-time players on the squad, Ecuador was thumped in three games, including the record 1–10 defeat to Switzerland. Nonetheless, Ecuador impressed in their final defeat to then-defending champions Japan, only conceded a goal in the team's 0–1 loss. Ecuador stood as the worst performed team in a FIFA Women's World Cup edition before Thailand surpassed Ecuador with an even more disastrous performance in 2019 FIFA Women's World Cup.

In 2019, the Ecuadorian Football Federation officially created the semi-professional Superliga Femenina, the first step toward moving to professional women's football for the team and a recognition for the team's growing popularity, and Ecuador's performance greatly improved in the 2022 Copa América Femenina. Nonetheless, Ecuador's lacklustre performance again hurt its campaign when the team lost three out of four, and failed to qualify for the 2023 FIFA Women's World Cup, though Ecuador did not suffer heavy defeats as expected.

Team image

Nicknames
The Ecuador women's national football team has been known or nicknamed as the "La Tricolor (Three colors)".

Home stadium
Ecuador play their home matches on the Estadio Olímpico Atahualpa.

Overall competitive record

Results and fixtures

The following is a list of match results in the last 12 months, as well as any future matches that have been scheduled.

Legend

2022

2023

Ecuador Results and Fixtures – Soccerway.com

Coaching staff

Current coaching staff

Manager history

 Garys Estupiñán (2003–2006)
 Juan Carlos Cerón (2010)
 Vanessa Arauz (2014–2015)
 Wendy Villón (2018)
  Emily Lima (2019–2022)

Players

 Up-to-date caps, goals, and statistics are not publicly available; therefore, caps and goals listed may be incorrect.

Current squad
 The following players were called up for the 2022 Copa América Femenina.
 Caps and goals correct as of 13 April 2021, before the match against .

Recent call-ups
 The following players have been called up to a Ecuador squad in the past 12 months.

Captains

Ligia Moreira (20??–)

Records

*Active players in bold, statistics correct as of 31 August 2021.

Most capped players

Top goalscorers

Competitive record

FIFA Women's World Cup

*Draws include knockout matches decided on penalty kicks.

Olympic Games

*Draws include knockout matches decided on penalty kicks.

CONMEBOL Copa América Femenina

*Draws include knockout matches decided on penalty kicks.

Pan American Games

*Draws include knockout matches decided on penalty kicks.

Bolivarian Games

*Draws include knockout matches decided on penalty kicks.

Honours

Bolivarian Games
 Bolivarian Games Football
  Silver medal (1): 2009.
  Bronze Medal (1): 2005.

See also

Sport in Ecuador
Football in Ecuador
Women's football in Ecuador
Ecuador women's national football team
Ecuador women's national football team results
List of Ecuador women's international footballers
Ecuador women's national under-20 football team
Ecuador women's national under-17 football team
Ecuador women's national futsal team
Ecuador men's national football team

References

External links
Official website
FIFA profile

 
South American women's national association football teams